Daniels Motorsport is a motorsport team based in the United Kingdom. The team are perhaps best known for their involvement in Ford Fiesta racing series and occasional appearances in the British Touring Car Championship.

History

British Touring Car Championship

2005
Daniels Motorsport made their BTCC running under the Team Nuts with Daniels Motorsport banner. The team campaigned a single Vauxhall Astra Coupé for Andy Neate

2006

In 2006 the team continued with the same car for Nick Leason in the latter two rounds of the BTCC season under the name of Team NJL Racing with Daniels Motorsport.

External links
Official site
Nick Leason
Andy Neate profile

British Touring Car Championship teams
British auto racing teams